Group B of 2022 Africa Women Cup of Nations was played from 3 to 9 July 2022. The group was made up of Cameroon, Zambia, Tunisia and debutants Togo.

Teams

Standings

Matches

Cameroon vs Zambia

Tunisia vs Togo

Zambia vs Tunisia

Togo vs Cameroon

Cameroon vs Tunisia

Zambia vs Togo

Discipline

Fair play points will be used as tiebreakers in the group if the overall and head-to-head records of teams were tied, or if teams had the same record in the ranking of third-placed teams. These are calculated based on yellow and red cards received in all group matches as follows:

 first yellow card: plus 1 point;
 indirect red card (second yellow card): plus 3 points;
 direct red card: plus 4 points;
 yellow card and direct red card: plus 5 points;

Goalscorers

Notes

References

External links

Group B